Holberg is a crater on Mercury.  Its name was adopted by the International Astronomical Union in 1976. Holberg is named for the Dano-Norwegian writer Ludvig Holberg, who lived from 1684 to 1754.

Spitteler crater is due south of Holberg.

References

Impact craters on Mercury